Prast is a surname. Notable people with the surname include:

  (born 1996), Italian alpine skier
 Klara Prast, fictional character
 Manuel Prast (1876–1973), Spanish footballer
 Simon Prast (born 1962), New Zealand director and actor